Martín Tristán Calvete (died 1546) was a Roman Catholic prelate who served as Bishop of Oviedo (1539–1546) and Bishop of Lugo (1534–1539).

Biography
On 8 June 1534, Martín Tristán Calvete was appointed during the papacy of Pope Clement VII as Bishop of Lugo.
On 30 May 1539, he was appointed during the papacy of Pope Paul III as Bishop of Oviedo. 
He served as Bishop of Oviedo until his death in 1546.

References

External links and additional sources
 (for Chronology of Bishops) 
 (for Chronology of Bishops) 
 (for Chronology of Bishops) 
 (for Chronology of Bishops) 

16th-century Roman Catholic bishops in Spain
Bishops appointed by Pope Clement VII
Bishops appointed by Pope Paul III
1546 deaths